Maindample is a former railway station in Maindample, Victoria, Australia. The tracks have been removed.

References

External links
Victorian Railway Stations - Maindample

Railway stations in Australia opened in 1891
Railway stations closed in 1978
Disused railway stations in Victoria (Australia)
Mansfield railway line